The 1997–98 season was the 96th season in which Dundee competed at a Scottish national level, playing in the Scottish First Division. Dundee would finish as league champions, and would be promoted to the newly revamped Scottish Premier League. Dundee would also compete in the Scottish League Cup, the Scottish Cup and the Scottish Challenge Cup, where they were knocked out by Rangers in the quarter-finals of the Scottish Cup, by Aberdeen in the 3rd round of the League Cup, and by Airdrieonians in the 1st round of the Challenge Cup.

Scottish First Division 

Statistics provided by Dee Archive.

League table

Scottish League Cup 

Statistics provided by Dee Archive.

Scottish Cup 

Statistics provided by Dee Archive.

Scottish Challenge Cup 

Statistics provided by Dee Archive.

Player statistics 
Statistics provided by Dee Archive

|}

See also 

 List of Dundee F.C. seasons

References

External links 

 1997–98 Dundee season on Fitbastats

Dundee F.C. seasons
Dundee